The 1971 Norwegian Football Cup was the 66th edition of the Norwegian annual knockout football tournament. The Cup was won by Rosenborg after beating Fredrikstad in the cup final with the score 4–1. This was Rosenborg's third Norwegian Cup title.

First round

|-
|colspan="3" style="background-color:#97DEFF"|Replay

|}

Second round

|-
|colspan="3" style="background-color:#97DEFF"|Replay

|}

Third round

|colspan="3" style="background-color:#97DEFF"|25 July 1971

|-
|colspan="3" style="background-color:#97DEFF"|28 July 1971

|-
|colspan="3" style="background-color:#97DEFF"|1 August 1971

|-
|colspan="3" style="background-color:#97DEFF"|Replay: 5 August 1971

|}

Fourth round

|colspan="3" style="background-color:#97DEFF"|15 August 1971

|}

Quarter-finals

|colspan="3" style="background-color:#97DEFF"|29 August 1971

|-
|colspan="3" style="background-color:#97DEFF"|Replay: 2 September 1971

|}

Semi-finals

|colspan="3" style="background-color:#97DEFF"|3 October 1971

|}

Final

References
http://www.rsssf.no

Norwegian Football Cup seasons
Norway
Football Cup